JBK may refer to:
 JBK (music), an English band
 Barikewa language
 Jakobstads Bollklubb, a Finnish soccer team
 Lehman ABS Corporation
 Jacqueline Bouvier Kennedy